Argentina competed at the 2018 Winter Olympics in Pyeongchang, South Korea, from 9 to 25 February 2018, with seven competitors in four sports.

Competitors
The following is the list of number of competitors participating in the Argentine delegation per sport.

Alpine skiing 

Argentina qualified two athletes, one male and one female.

Cross-country skiing 

Argentina qualified two athletes, one male and one female.

Distance

Luge 

Argentina qualified one sled.

Snowboarding 

Argentina received reallocation spots in the men's big air, slopestyle and snowboard cross events.

Freestyle

Snowboard cross

See also
Argentina at the 2018 Summer Youth Olympics

References

Nations at the 2018 Winter Olympics
2018
2018 in Argentine sport